XCOPY is a digital artist active in the field of Crypto Art and NFTs. His real identity is unknown. He creates digital glitched artworks usually concerning death, dystopia and apathy through flashing imagery and distorted loops, often with nods to the cryptocurrency community. Some of his most notable works are released on a  CC0 license and he is among the highest selling NFT artists.

NFTs 
XCOPY is known as one of the first digital artists to create NFTs associated with his artworks. His artworks were first associated with NFTs in 2018 via platforms like SuperRare and others.

Notable works

Right-Click and Save As Guy 
Right-Click and Save As Guy is one of XCOPY's most famous artworks. The title refers to the common criticism of NFT artworks that anybody can save a copy from the web by right-clicking the image.

The NFT associated with the piece last sold for approximately $7,000,000 on 9 December 2021, making it one of the highest selling NFTs.

Grifters 
On 15 December 2021, XCOPY launched "Grifters" via Async Art's Blueprints platform, a collection of 666 artworks commonly used as avatars amongst online communities.

Art shows and features 

 “Lugano NFT Week” exhibition at Villa Ciani in Lugano, 2021
 "CryptOGs": The Pioneers of NFT Art" at Bonhams, 2021
 “DART2121” exhibition at Museo della Permanente in Milan, 2021
 “Milano Art Week 2022” exhibition in Milan, 2022

References

External links
 Official website

Living people
Year of birth missing (living people)
Graphic artists
Digital artists
Pseudonymous artists